The 2015–16 Mizoram Premier League (also known Mc Dowell's Mizoram Premier League Season 4 for sponsorship reasons) is the 4th season of the Mizoram Premier League which is the top tier of the Mizoram football system.  The campaign began on 10 September 2015 and ended on 15 December 2015.

Aizawl F.C. won its 2nd title on 15 December 2015 after defeating Chanmari F.C. at the Lammual Stadium.

Table
2015–16 Mizoram Premier League standings

Result Table

; ; ;

Bracket

Knockout Phase
All times are Indian Standard Time (IST) – UTC+05:30.

Semi-finals
*Away goal rule not applicable.

First leg

Second leg

Final

Awards

Mizoram Premier League 4 Awards.

Club Awards

List of Individual Awards Winner

Promotion & Relegation Playoff
Champions of district football associations took part in qualification. Four clubs played in round-robin format. The club which topped the group directly qualified for the 2016–17 season of Mizoram Premier League. The club which came 2nd will take part in play-offs against Luangmual F.C. which finished 7th in previous season.

Standings

Fixture & Results
All times are Indian Standard Time (IST) – UTC+05:30.

Matchday 1

Matchday 2

Matchday 3

Playoffs

First leg

Second leg

References

External links
 Mizoram Premier League 2015-16

Mizoram Premier League
3